The 49th General Assembly of Newfoundland and Labrador was elected on May 16, 2019. Members of the House of Assembly were sworn in on June 10, 2019. The Assembly was dissolved on January 15, 2021 after premier Andrew Furey called a snap election held on February 13.

Seating plan

List of current members

References

47
2019 establishments in Newfoundland and Labrador
2019 in Newfoundland and Labrador
2020 in Newfoundland and Labrador
2019 in Canadian politics
2020 in Canadian politics
Minority governments